The Collins and Ludowici Railroad was a railroad that operated in the U.S. state of Georgia in the early 20th century.

In 1915, the Georgia Coast and Piedmont Railroad entered receivership and was subsequently broken up.  Part of this railroad became the Collins and Ludowici Railroad in 1919.  Originally, the line ran through Collins, Glennville, Darien and Brunswick, Georgia.  By 1921, the line was reduced to running  between Collins and Glennville and was then renamed the Collins and Glennville Railroad.

References 

Defunct Georgia (U.S. state) railroads
Railway companies established in 1919
1919 establishments in Georgia (U.S. state)
Railway companies disestablished in 1923
1923 disestablishments in Georgia (U.S. state)